The following is a timeline of the history of Oklahoma City, Oklahoma, US.

Prior to 20th century
1887
February: A stop along the newly completed Southern Kansas Railway line was constructed and named "Oklahoma Station." 
December 30: The United States Postal Service established a post office at Oklahoma Station.
 1889
 April 22: Settlement established on Unassigned Lands of the United States.
 Oklahoma Times, Weekly Oklahoman, and Oklahoma Gazette newspapers begin publication.
 1890
 Town charted in Oklahoma Territory.
 W.J. Gault becomes mayor.
 Population: 4,151.
 1896 – January: Statehood convention held.

20th century

1900s–1940s

 1901
 Epworth University founded.
 Douglass High School active (approximate date).
 1902 – Oklahoma Historical Society headquartered in Oklahoma City.
 1905 – Brock Dry Goods in business.
 1906 – Oklahoma College for Young Women founded.
 1907
 Town becomes part of the new U.S. state of Oklahoma.
 Population: 32,452.
 Elmer L. Fulton becomes U.S. representative for Oklahoma's 2nd congressional district.
 1908
 Temple B’nai Israel synagogue built.
 Dick Thompson Morgan becomes U.S. representative for Oklahoma's 2nd congressional district.
 1909 – Colcord Building constructed.
 1910
 Oklahoma state capital relocated to Oklahoma City from Guthrie.
 Cattlemen's Cafe in business.
 Population: 64,205.
 1911
 Oklahoma City University established.
 Skirvin Hotel in business.
 1913 – Board of Health established.
 1915 – Joseph Bryan Thompson becomes U.S. representative for Oklahoma's 5th congressional district.
 1916
 Black Dispatch newspaper begins publication.
 Blackwood David Business College established.
 1917 – Emanuel Synagogue active.
 1918 – Cain's Coffee Building constructed.
 1919
 Lake Overholser reservoir and Oklahoma State Capitol built.
 Aldridge Theater opens (approximate date).
 John W. Harreld becomes U.S. representative for Oklahoma's 5th congressional district.
 1920
 WKY radio begins broadcasting.
 Population: 91,295.
 1921
 Calvary Baptist Church built.
 Fletcher B. Swank becomes U.S. representative for Oklahoma's 5th congressional district.
 1922
 Ritz Theater opens.
 Lynching of Jake Brooks Photographs of Jake Brooks's hanged body are sent to Congress, hoping for passage of the Dyer Anti-Lynching Bill. 
 1923 – KOCY radio begins broadcasting.
 1925 – Oklahoma City Blue Devils jazz band active.
 1927 – New Quayle Methodist Episcopal Church built.
 1928 – Oil discovered.
 1929 – Ulysses S. Stone becomes U.S. representative for Oklahoma's 5th congressional district
 1930 – Population: 185,389.
 1931
 Union Station opens.
 First National Bank Building constructed.
 Fletcher Swank becomes U.S. representative for Oklahoma's 5th congressional district again.
 1934
 Taft Stadium built.
 Santa Fe Depot opens.
 1935 – Joshua B. Lee becomes U.S. representative for Oklahoma's 5th congressional district.
 1937
 Daily Law Journal Record newspaper headquartered in city.
 Robert P. Hill becomes U.S. representative for Oklahoma's 5th congressional district, succeeded by Gomer Griffith Smith.
 1939 – Mike Monroney becomes U.S. representative for Oklahoma's 5th congressional district.
 1940 – Population: 204,424.
 1941 – U.S. military Tinker Air Force Base established.
 1946 – Urban League established.
 1948 – Milk Bottle Grocery in business.
 1949 – WKY-TV (television) begins broadcasting.

1950s–1990s

 1950
 Circle Drive-In cinema opens.
 Population: 243,504.
 1951 – John Jarman becomes U.S. representative for Oklahoma's 5th congressional district.
 1953 – KWTV (television) begins broadcasting.
 1954 – Griffin Television Tower erected.
 1955 – Cowboy Hall of Fame and Museum established.
 1958 – Oklahoma City sit-ins led by Clara Luper for racial desegregation begin.
 1960
 Penn Square Mall in business.
 Population: 324,253.
 1962 – Oklahoma City 89ers baseball team formed.
 1964
 July: Oklahoma City sonic boom tests begin.
 Founders Tower built.
 1965
 Central Business District redevelopment plan ("Pei plan") adopted.
 Community Action Agency of Oklahoma City established.
 1966
 Central Oklahoma Transportation and Parking Authority established.
 Citizens Bank Tower built.
 1968 – Harn Homestead and 1889ers Museum founded.
 1969
 August 19: Sanitation labor strike begins.
 Oklahoma City Community Foundation established.
 1970
 Oklahoma Theater Center built.
 Population: 366,481.
 1971
 University of Oklahoma Health Sciences Center active.
 Patience Latting becomes mayor.
 Chase Tower built.
 1972
 Premiere of Western film J. W. Coop.
 Myriad Convention Center opens.
 Henry Overholser historic site established.
 1974 – Underground pedestrian concourse built.
 1976 – 45th Infantry Division Museum established.
 1977
 Murrah Federal Building constructed.
 Mickey Edwards becomes U.S. representative for Oklahoma's 5th congressional district.
 1979 – Black Chronicle newspaper begins publication.
 1980
 Oklahoma City Food Bank organized.
 Population: 403,213.
 1983 – Andy Coats becomes mayor.
 1984 – Oklahoma City Public Schools Foundation established.
 1987
 Grusendorf v. City of Oklahoma City smoking-related lawsuit decided.
 Ron Norick becomes mayor.
 1988
 Oklahoma City Pride begins.
 Myriad Botanical Gardens Tropical Conservatory opens.
 1990 – Population: 444,719.
 1993 – Ernest Istook becomes U.S. representative for Oklahoma's 5th congressional district.
 1994 – Grateful Bean Cafe opens.
 1995
 April 19: Oklahoma City bombing.
 City website online.
 1999 – Kirk Humphreys becomes mayor.
 2000 – Population: 506,132.

21st century

 2001 – Oklahoma City National Memorial opens.
 2002
 Ford Center stadium opens.
 Oklahoma City Lightning women's football team formed.
 2003 – Guy Liebmann becomes mayor.
 2004 – Mick Cornett becomes mayor.
 2005 – Will Rogers World Airport's new terminal opens.
 2006 – Douglass Mid-High School built.
 2007 – Mary Fallin becomes U.S. representative for Oklahoma's 5th congressional district.
 2008 – Oklahoma City Thunder basketball team active.
 2010
 Oklahoma City Barons ice hockey team active.
 Population: 579,999.
 2011 – James Lankford becomes U.S. representative for Oklahoma's 5th congressional district.
 2012 – Devon Tower built.
 2014 – Municipal Archives established.
 2015 – Steve Russell becomes U.S. representative for Oklahoma's 5th congressional district.

See also
 History of Oklahoma City
 List of mayors of Oklahoma City
 National Register of Historic Places listings in Oklahoma County, Oklahoma
 Timelines of other cities in Oklahoma: Norman, Tulsa

References

Bibliography

 
 
 
  + v.2–3
 Angelo C. Scott, The Story of Oklahoma City (Oklahoma City, Okla.: Times-Journal Publishing Co., 1939).
 
 
 
 Roy P. Stewart, Born Grown: An Oklahoma City History (Oklahoma City, Okla.: Fidelity Bank, 1974).
 Pendleton Woods, "Oklahoma City Metropolitan Area," in Cities of Oklahoma, ed. John W. Morris (Oklahoma City: Oklahoma Historical Society, 1979).
 
 Odie B. Faulk, Laura E. Faulk, and Bob L. Blackburn, Oklahoma City: A Centennial Portrait (Northridge, Calif.: Windsor Publications, 1988).
 Susan Wallace and Tamara J. Hermen, Oklahoma City: A Better Living, A Better Life (Montgomery, Ala.: Community Communications, 1997).

External links

 Items related to Oklahoma City, various dates (via Digital Public Library of America)
 Materials related to Oklahoma City, various dates (via US Library of Congress, Prints & Photos Division)

 
Oklahoma City
 
Years in Oklahoma